Chavez Island is an island  long which rises to , lying immediately west of Magnier Peninsula, which is between Leroux Bay and Bigo Bay, off the west coast of Graham Land. It was discovered and named by the French Antarctic Expedition, 1908–10, under Jean-Baptiste Charcot, probably for Commandant Alfonso Chaves of Ponta Delgada, Azores, but the spelling Chavez has become established through long usage.

See also 
 List of Antarctic and sub-Antarctic islands
 Trickster Rocks
 Verge Rocks

Maps
 British Antarctic Territory.  Scale 1:200000 topographic map. DOS 610 Series, Sheet W 65 64.  Directorate of Overseas Surveys, Tolworth, UK, 1971.

References 

 SCAR Composite Gazetteer of Antarctica.

Islands of Graham Land
Graham Coast